Luxembourg Gardens, Paris is an oil painting by Albert Edelfelt completed in 1887 of a scene in the Jardin du Luxembourg in Paris, France. The painting has become a kind of symbol of Edelfelt and the whole of Finnish art, at a time when Paris was the center of the whole art world. The work is also a larger Edelfelt  paintings and a major en plein air painting.

Description
The painting depicts women and children playing on the Luxembourg Gardens’ sandy ground. The women are equal with the exception of children's nurses and nurse. The nurse wears a long robe and ruched long-tape hat. To the left a mother in a gray-suit is shown. Women sit in a chair and spend a leisurely time on a beautiful summer day. In the foreground a girl has a wooden hoop. In the middle a girl and the only boy playing, and in the distance is horse-pinion play. The painting depicts the same wealthy Parisian families and the lives of children at the end of 1800s.

Analysis
In Luxembourg Gardens, Paris, Edelfelt seemed too "anemic" at that time, but shows the color of joy in the midst of the influx of impressionistic paintings, even though he was about to receive rave reviews. Unlike daily habits, Edelfelt had tried to describe the fleeting moment of the painting is characteristic of Impressionism. Lighting and light is visible in the picture, and Edelfelt did a lot of sketches on the spot. However, he finished the work largely in Haikko. Edelfelt applied work, however, freer painterly means. For example, he made a painting color painting the ship and took the creative contrast of complementary colors. Despite the transitory nature of Impressionist painting stand out well against clothing fabrics and feel of the material. in the shadow of the foreground figures are painted very closely.

Edelfelt was at this time already fairly well known by the Paris art world having lived there for ten years. It is surprising that among his works, there are no other large Paris-themed works. The reason is probably that in Paris, he was able to stand out from the competition with piquant and exotic Finnish topics.

Provenance
Luxembourg Gardens was exhibited for the first time at the Galerie Petit's exhibition in May 1887. It belonged to Paris, who has lived their adult lives Viktor Antell collections. Today, the painting belongs to the Ateneum Art Museum, Antell Collection, where it was recorded in 1908. Viktor Antell bequeathed with the rest of the painting collection of the State of Finland, which it ended up in the collections of the Ateneum.

Documentary film
The painting has been made into a film in 1987, directed by Tapani Lundgren and Marjatta Levanto and Levanto Yrjänä. Itw as a 14-minute-long documentary Luxembourg Gardens. The film is based on Edelfelt's letters, and it tells the origin of the painting. In his letters Edelfelt describes the despair when the painting does not progress and satisfaction when one detail was successful. The painting was a work in progress and a half years.

References

External links
 Teos Suomen Kansallisgallerian verkkosivuilla. 
 Lopullinen luonnos teokseen Pariisin Luxembourgin puistossa, 1886, 26×35 cm, öljy puulle, Suomen Kansallisgallerian verkkosivuilla
 Harjoitelma Luxembourgin puistossa-maalausta varten, n.1886, lyijykynä, Suomen Kansallisgallerian verkkosivuilla

1887 paintings
Paintings by Albert Edelfelt
Paintings in the collection of the Ateneum
Paintings of people
Culture in Helsinki
Arts in Paris
Works about Paris
6th arrondissement of Paris